Norman F. Penny (ca. 1905 – February 13, 1962) was an American banker, insurance broker, investor, and politician from New York.

Biography 
Penny was born in Roslyn, New York ca. 1905. He attended Brown University for college. In 1938, Penny was elected to the New York State Assembly, representing the 2nd Assembly district as a Republican, succeeding Leonard W. Hall. He served in this capacity between 1938 and 1942. During his time in the New York State Assembly, he co-sponsored New York's pari-mutuel law. Penny also led efforts to improve grade crossing safety in Nassau County and throughout the state through a bill mandating that all grade crossings in Nassau County be equipped with lights and bells, and pushed for infrastructure improvements for the Long Island Rail Road – including upgrades to grade crossings to improve safety and an unsuccessful push to electrify the Oyster Bay Branch.

In 1946, following his military service, Penny declined to accept the GOP nomination for New York State Assemblyman, opting not to run for the position which he had previously held; at the time, he resided at 91 Rocky Wood Road in the Strathmore section of Manhasset. Penny was succeeded in the New York State Assembly by William S. Hults, Jr., who resided at the time at 14 Lowell Road in the New Salem section of Port Washington.

Penny also served as the Town of North Hempstead's Republican leader for many years, as well as remaining a prominent figure in Nassau County politics.

Military service 
During World War II, he served in the United States Air Force and was stationed at Lincoln Air Force Base in Lincoln, Nebraska, earning the ranking of Major in 1944; he served as Base Intelligence Officer and as Public Relations Officer.

Death 
Penny died on February 13, 1962, in his sleep from a heart attack at his home on Knolls Lane in Flower Hill. He was 57 years old. His funeral was held at Fairchild & Sons in Manhasset.

Personal life 
Penny was married to his wife, and the couple had 3 children.

Penny was involved with the Cerebral Palsy Foundation of Nassau County, serving as the chair of the 1952 fund drive.

References 

Politicians from Nassau County, New York
Members of the New York State Assembly
People from Manhasset, New York
Flower Hill, New York
Brown University alumni
1905 births
1962 deaths